Ridley Wilks Plaisted (18 December 1885 – 2 July 1954) was an Australian rules footballer. He played five games for Fitzroy in the Victorian Football League (VFL) between 1905 and 1907 and kicked eight goals. His debut match was the 1905 Round 15 clash with St Kilda at Brunswick Street.

References

Holmesby, Russell and Main, Jim (2011). The Encyclopedia of AFL Footballers. 9th ed. Melbourne: Bas Publishing.

1885 births
1954 deaths
Fitzroy Football Club players
Australian players of Australian rules football